My Time at Portia is a video game developed by Chinese studio Pathea Games and published by Team17 for Microsoft Windows, macOS, Nintendo Switch, PlayStation 4 and Xbox One in 2019. An Android and iOS version was released in early August 2021. It combines aspects of role-playing video games and simulation games.

Plot
The game takes place long after civilization has been destroyed, where humans have emerged from underground and begun rebuilding society. The player is cast in the role of the child of a famous builder, who inherits their father's workshop in the independent city state of Portia after he goes travelling. The goal of the game is to expand the city of Portia and become the best builder.

Gameplay 
The player must gather resources and combine them in recipes to create items. Eventually, players gain more tools that allow them to harvest resources faster, such as a chainsaw to chop down large trees. Once items are complete, they can be submitted for rewards, town favor and money. The largest assignments can directly change the town itself. The game also contains dungeons that require the player to fight enemies.

Reception

My Time at Portia received "mixed or average" reviews, according to review aggregator Metacritic. Miranda Sanchez of IGN gave the game 8 out of 10, calling its core gameplay fun, but saying that each of its parts was lacking in some way, and that the game had "annoying audio bugs". Alex Fuller of RPGamer rated it 3.5 out of 5, calling the game "charming" and "a lovely place to spend time in", but also saying that it was too long, criticizing how "players have to wait for NPCs to decide to do something". He stated that it was "very enjoyable", but had "significant weaknesses". Rich Meister of Destructoid rated the game 5.5/10, saying that while the world was "bright and full of charm", "waiting around for things to happen can get old pretty fast", and calling the game's mining "painfully dull". Philippa Warr of PC Gamer gave the game a 63 out of 100 and criticized the game's pacing, stating, "By being so slow, My Time At Portia both repels and appeals. It offers a kind of gaming oasis, making few demands and just pootling along. That type of thing can be a place of respite for the right player or the right mood." Ginny Woo of GameSpot rated the game 6 out of 10 and praised its tranquil environment, pleasing aesthetics, and well-designed crafting system while lamenting the lack of meaning in several mechanics, the lack of payoff in the narrative's premise, and the conflicting day-night cycle pacing. Zoe Delahunty-Light of GamesRadar+ lauded the convincing NPCs, varied seasonal events, and sense of progression while taking issue with the loading times and lack of voice acting in cutscenes. Chris Scullion of Nintendo Life recommended the game after a patch was issued in order to fix its lengthy loading times. Rebecca Stow of Push Square called the game "vibrant, relaxing, and brimming with charm".

The PC version was among the best-selling new releases of the month on Steam.

Sequel
In October 2020, Pathea Games announced that a sequel titled My Time at Sandrock, and planned to release in early access for PC via Steam in March 2021, with the full version for Nintendo Switch, PlayStation 4, PlayStation 5, Xbox One and Xbox Series X/S in summer 2022. However in March 2021, Pathea Games announced that they have not received a local rating certification to publish the game online, so it seems like early access would be potentially delayed until after May 2021. Early access release was subsequently pushed out further until early 2022. The game released via early access on May 26, 2022.

Notes

References

2019 video games
Action role-playing video games
Android (operating system) games
IOS games
Life simulation games
Nintendo Switch games
PlayStation 4 games
Post-apocalyptic video games
Single-player video games
Team17 games
Video games developed in China
Video games featuring protagonists of selectable gender
Windows games
Xbox Cloud Gaming games
Xbox One games
Farming video games